The Archdiocese of Calabar (Latin Archidioecesis Calabarensis) is a Latin Church ecclesiastical territory or diocese of the Catholic Church in Nigeria. Its archepiscopal see is Calabar, Cross River State. The Archbishop of Calabar is metropolitan of an ecclesiastical province with four suffragan dioceses: the Dioceses of Ikot Ekpene, Ogoja, Port Harcourt, and Uyo.

History
 1934.07.09: Established as Apostolic Prefecture of Calabar from the Apostolic Vicariate of Western Nigeria 
 1947.06.12: Promoted as Apostolic Vicariate of Calabar
 1950.04.18: Promoted as Diocese of Calabar 
 1994.03.26: Promoted as Metropolitan Archdiocese of Calabar

Special churches
 Cathedral: Sacred Heart Cathedral in Calabar 
 Pro-Cathedral:  Saint Mary’s Pro-Cathedral in Calabar.

Bishops
 Prefect Apostolic of Calabar
 Father James Moynagh, S.P.S. 1934.10.26 – 1947.06.12 see below
 Vicar Apostolic of Calabar (Roman rite) 
 Bishop James Moynagh, S.P.S. see above 1947.06.12 – 1950.04.18 see below
 Bishops of Calabar (Roman rite) 
 Bishop James Moynagh, S.P.S. see above 1950.04.18 – 1970.02.05
 Bishop Brian David Usanga 1970.02.05 – 1994.03.26 see below
 Metropolitan Archbishops of Calabar (Roman rite)
 Archbishop Brian David Usanga see above 1994.03.26 – 2003.12.17
 Archbishop Joseph Edra Ukpo 2003.12.17 - 2013.02.02; Archbishop Emeritus; resignation accepted by Pope Benedict XVI
 Archbishop Joseph Effiong Ekuwem 2013.02.02 - present; formerly, Bishop of the Roman Catholic Diocese of Uyo

Auxiliary Bishops
Dominic Ignatius Ekandem (1953-1963), appointed Bishop of Ikot Ekpene (Cardinal in 1976)
Brian David Usanga (1966-1970), appointed Bishop here

Suffragan dioceses
 Diocese of Ikot Ekpene
 Diocese of Ogoja
 Diocese of Port Harcourt
 Diocese of Uyo

See also
 Roman Catholicism in Nigeria
 Roman Catholic churches in Port Harcourt

References

External links
 GCatholic.org Information
 Catholic-Hierarchy.org Information

Calabar
Calabar